Gunnellichthys curiosus, the curious wormfish, is a species of wormfish native to the Indian Ocean from the Seychelles and Mauritius to the Hawaiian Islands in the central Pacific Ocean. It occurs in areas with substrates that allow it to conceal itself in burrows. It reaches a length of  SL. This fish can also be found in the aquarium trade.

References

Microdesmidae
Gobiidae
Fish of Hawaii
Taxa named by Charles Eric Dawson
Fish described in 1968